Juicy was an American musical duo consisting of siblings Jerry Barnes and Katreese Barnes. The group is best known for the songs "Sugar Free" and Beat Street feature song "Beat Street Strut".

Career
Their debut single "Don't Cha Wanna" was released in 1982 by Arista Records. In the same year they also released their first eponymous album, which made it into Billboard R&B chart the next year.

In 1984, their song "Beat Street Strut", released by the same label, appeared in the 1984 musical-drama movie Beat Street and its gold-certified soundtrack. The song peaked at #46 on Billboard Dance chart in July 1984.

Their second album It Takes Two was released in 1985. The album featured an answer record to the Mtume song "Juicy Fruit" called "Sugar Free". It peaked at #13 on the Billboard R&B chart and #45 on the UK Singles Chart. Another moderately successful single from the album include "Nobody but You", reaching number 59 on the R&B chart.

Their last album Spread the Love released in 1987 was commercially unsuccessful, resulting in Juicy's disbanding. Katreese Barnes later became a producer, songwriter and the musical director for Saturday Night Live. She won the Primetime Emmy Award for Outstanding Original Music and Lyrics twice for composing music for SNL, first in 2007 as co-writer of The Lonely Island's "Dick in a Box" and again in 2011 for writing a monologue for Justin Timberlake. Katreese Barnes died of breast cancer on August 3, 2019 at the age of 56.

Discography

Studio albums

Singles

References

External links
 

Sibling musical duos
American musical duos
American dance music groups
American boogie musicians
American contemporary R&B musical groups
Arista Records artists
Musical groups established in 1982
1982 establishments in the United States